Tapio Lehto (8 December 1930 – 5 February 2019) was a Finnish athlete. He competed in the men's triple jump at the 1956 Summer Olympics.

References

External links
 

1930 births
2019 deaths
Athletes (track and field) at the 1956 Summer Olympics
Finnish male triple jumpers
Olympic athletes of Finland
Place of birth missing